Edmund Jowett (6 January 1858 – 14 April 1936) was an Australian pastoralist and politician. He was born in England and arrived in Australia at the age of 18, eventually amassing vast pastoral holdings across Victoria, New South Wales, and Queensland. Jowett was elected to federal parliament at the 1917 Grampians by-election, as a Nationalist. He joined the Country Party upon its formation in 1920. He served as the party's inaugural deputy leader for just over one year, on a provisional basis under the leadership of William McWilliams.

Early life

Jowett was born in Bradford, Yorkshire, England, on 6 January 1858 to Joseph Jowett and Sarah, née Craven. He attended Mr James Ward's Classical School at Clapham Common in London and went to his uncle's wool mill at Thornton. He migrated to Melbourne in Australia in 1876 with his father and elder brother Charles, where he worked on The Argus and contributed to the Australasian Banking Record. He married Annette Rose McCallum on 24 November 1883 at East St Kilda.

Pastoralist

Jowett gradually accumulated property in Queensland, New South Wales and Victoria, eventually controlling more than forty properties including Palparara, Boorara and Kynuna Stations and owned over six million acres (24,000 km2). The Bulletin stated at his death that he had owned more sheep than anyone in the world. He was appointed growers' representative on the Central Wool Committee (a wartime institution) in 1916, and also served on the Commonwealth Bureau of Commerce and Industry and the Victorian Meat Advisory Committee.

Politics

Jowett was influenced as a young man by Sir Frederick Sargood; his early political activity consists of membership of the Young Victorian Patriotic League and campaigning for conscription. In 1917 he became the first Victorian vice-president of the Nationalist Party; in the election of that year he unsuccessfully contested the seat of Maribyrnong. However, in October he won the by-election for the seat of Grampians that followed the death of Carty Salmon, and became a member of the Country Party in 1920.

On 25 February 1920, Jowett was elected unopposed as the inaugural deputy leader of the Country Party, with William McWilliams as leader. He did not re-contest the position when it was declared vacant on 5 April 1921, and was succeeded by Henry Gregory. His seat was abolished in 1922, and he contested Bendigo instead, but was unsuccessful. He continued to be active in the Country Party.

Later life

An advocate of electoral reform and proportional representation, Jowett always encouraged the immigration of Britons to Australia. He also produced a number of publications, and was a company director for some years. On 14 April 1936 he died at Strathane, one of his properties in the Queensland district of Leyburn, and was buried at St Kilda. He was survived by his wife, a son and three daughters.

One of his grandsons was the cabinet minister David Fairbairn.

Publications

The Unnatural Fall in Prices Due to Currency Legislation (1895)
The Ruinous Fall in the Prices of Produce and the Prevailing Scarcity of Money (1894)
Electoral reform for Australia (1917)
Proportional Representation for the Senate (1919)

References

Sources

1858 births
1936 deaths
Nationalist Party of Australia members of the Parliament of Australia
National Party of Australia members of the Parliament of Australia
Members of the Australian House of Representatives
Members of the Australian House of Representatives for Grampians
20th-century Australian politicians